Fort Curtis was a defensive position used by the Union Army to defend Helena, Arkansas, during the American Civil War. Built in 1862 after the Union occupation of the city, it only saw combat once, in the Battle of Helena on July 4, 1863. Military use of the site ended in 1866, and the fort was destroyed in 1874. The Sidney H. Horner House now occupies a portion of the original site. A reconstruction, known as New Fort Curtis, was opened in 2012. There is some uncertainty about both the exact armament and size of the original fort.

History

Construction and early use 

In April 1861, the American Civil War began, pitting the United States of America against the secessionist Confederate States of America. One of the states that seceded and joined the Confederacy was the state of Arkansas. The first year of the war saw fighting north of Arkansas in the border state of Missouri, and in early March 1862, Union (United States) forces commanded by Major General Samuel R. Curtis defeated a Confederate army in the Battle of Pea Ridge in northwestern Arkansas. The next month, Curtis's men began a campaign that ended in mid-July with the occupation of the city of Helena, which is in eastern Arkansas on the Mississippi River.

Curtis's command, known as the Army of the Southwest, began building defenses, as they were in hostile territory. In mid-August, work on Fort Curtis, which was named after the Union commander, began. Both Union soldiers and freed slaves contributed to the construction. The fort was located in a position where it would have a commanding field of fire that covered almost all of the surrounding area. It was completed by October 29, and a dedication for the fort was held the next day. After its completion, Fort Curtis served as an important Union post in the area. The Union troops defending Helena generally believed that the fort would provide adequate defense against an assault, but Major General Frederick Steele and Military Governor of Arkansas John S. Phelps doubted the capabilities of the position and had opposed its construction.

The fort was made of earth and was shaped in a square. Two gunpowder magazines and a well were located in Fort Curtis. The exact intended armament of the fort is not known, although an archaeological investigation in the 1960s found evidence of a barbette for a 24-pounder cannon in each of the fort's four corners, as well as positions for three other cannons along the walls. The 24-pounder guns were removed from the fort in May 1863 for use in the Vicksburg campaign. A Union soldier writing before the fort's completion state that six cannons were present and earmarked for use in Fort Curtis, of sizes ranging from 32-pounders to 64-pounders. Another Union soldier wrote two months after the fort's completion that it contained nine 32-pounder guns, while a visitor in November 1863 reported that Fort Curtis mounted a number of heavy cannons, with the largest being a 42-pounder gun. The exact size of Fort Curtis is also unknown: it may have been as a large as a city block, or it could have been smaller.

Later use and destruction 

In mid-1863, the Confederate leadership decided to attack Helena in hopes of retaking it and relieving some of the pressure on the Siege of Vicksburg in Mississippi. The new Union commander at Helena, Major General Benjamin Prentiss, expected an assault and had four additional defensive works constructed. These works were known as Batteries A, B, C, and D. Fort Curtis was located east of Batteries B and C, and was positioned between the two works. At this time, Fort Curtis was armed with three 30-pounder Parrott rifles. These guns were manned by infantrymen from the 33rd Missouri Infantry Regiment. Prentiss arranged for the warning signal that Helena was under assault to be a single cannon shot from Fort Curtis.

On the morning of July 4, the Confederates attacked. Fort Curtis fired its warning shot at about 3:30 am. Confederate attacks on both flanks were repulsed by the other batteries, but part of the Confederate force was able to overrun Battery C. Union reinforcements were rushed to the Fort Curtis area, and when Confederate troops tried to assault Fort Curtis, they were mowed down. The cannons at Fort Curtis joined with the three surviving lettered batteries and the gunboat USS Tyler in firing on the Confederates at Battery C. Defeated, the Confederates withdrew at about 10:30 am, ending the threat to Helena.

Helena was not the subject of a significant Confederate threat for the rest of the war, and the city served as a Union base during the Little Rock campaign in September 1863. Fort Curtis continued to be a Union base for the rest of the war, which ended in 1865 with a Confederate defeat. The last Union troops occupying Fort Curtis left in 1866, and the fort was abandoned. Fort Curtis was destroyed in 1874, and the site was subdivided into city lots. The Sidney H. Horner House was constructed on part of the location in the early 1880s. As part of a 2005 plan to jumpstart economic development in the area, a reconstruction of Fort Curtis was built; the new fort was dedicated in 2012. Known as New Fort Curtis, the reconstruction is open to the public and features exhibits, historic interpretation, and cannons.

Notes

References

Sources 

 Note: ISBN printed in book is 0-89029-516-3.

American Civil War forts
Demolished buildings and structures in Arkansas
Curtis
Curtis
Military installations established in 1862
Military installations closed in 1866
Rebuilt buildings and structures in Arkansas
Tourist attractions in Phillips County, Arkansas